Traveller was launched at Peterhead in 1815. She made three voyages to India, sailing under a licence from the British East India Company (EIC), and then from 1821 to 1858 she was a whaler and sealer in the British northern whale fishery. She was wrecked on 2 May 1858.

Career
Traveller first appeared in the Register of Shipping (RS) in the volume for 1815.

On 25 June 1815, Traveller, Douchy, master, was at Archangel. Traveller, Dutcher, master, arrived at Gravesend on 31 August, from Archangel. On 23 May 1816, Traveller, Duthie, master, arrived at Petersburg  from London. She returned to Gravesend on 19 August.

In 1813 the EIC had lost its monopoly on the trade between India and Britain. British ships were then free to sail to India or the Indian Ocean under a licence from the EIC.

On 28 April 1817, Traveller, Hutchinson, master, sailed from Gravesend for Bombay, sailing under a licence from the EIC. On 6 February 1818 she was at the Cape of Good Hope, having arrived there from Penang; on 10 March she was off Ascension. On 4 May she reached Dartmouth and on 7 May she arrived at Gravesend.

On 26 September 1818 Traveller,  Hutchinson, master, sailed from Gravesend, bound for Bombay. She sailed from Bombay on 7 March 1819 and was off The Start on 7 August 1819.

On 12 November 1819 Traveller, Hutchinson, master, sailed from Gravesend, bound for Bombay.

On 19 September 1820 Traveller, Hutchinson, master, arrived at Gravesend, having left Bombay on 1 May.

Traveller became a whaler, operating out of Peterhead. Having left for Greenland from London she returned to Peterhead in autumn 1821. 

Almost all the tabular data below is from the Scottish Arctic Whaling Database. The data for 1843 is from Sutherland.

On 2 July 1830 the whaler  became trapped in ice at Davis Strait, leading her crew to abandon her and join other whaling vessels in the area. The crews of Traveller and  worked for 48 hours to clear her of ice. They then set fire to the upper part of William, lightening her and causing her to rise. When she rose to the point that the beams above the casks of blubber she had collected were exposed, they set fire to them too. When the casks appeared, the crews put out the fire. When Williams master would not sign over her blubber and whale fins to the crews, Zephyr sailed away. Traveller took on 70 butts of blubber and one ton of whale fins. Captain Simpson took them back with him and sold them, keeping the proceeds for himself and his men. Williams owners sued for the proceeds, but Simpson argued that it was a long-standing custom of the whaling trade that salvaged cargo belonged to the men who had salvaged it. The jury found for the plaintiffs, who had estimated the value of the lost whale products at £500, and awarded them £392. Although all but one witness, all of whom were masters of whaling ships, testified for the defendant, the jury found for the plaintiff.

Over her career Traveller gathered 3568–3858 tons of oil. The value was around £200,000.

Fate
From 1854, Traveller joined Captain William Penny, in opening up  over-wintering and land station-based whaling in Cumberland Gulf. 

Traveller was driven ashore by ice and wrecked on 2 May 1858 in Frobisher Bay. She fell on her side and a heavy piece of ice pressed down on her. Some provisions and other articles were recovered.

Gem and Jackall rescued her crew.

Notes

Citations

References
 
 
 

1815 ships
Ships built in Scotland
Age of Sail merchant ships of England
Whaling ships
Sealing ships
Maritime incidents in July 1830
Maritime incidents in May 1858